The 4 × 400 metres relay or long relay is an athletics track event in which teams consist of four runners who each complete 400 metres or one lap. It is traditionally the final event of a track meet. At top class events, the first leg and the first bend of the second leg are run in lanes. Start lines are thus staggered over a greater distance than in an individual 400 metres race; the runners then typically move to the inside of the track. The slightly longer 4 × 440 yards relay was a formerly run British and American event, until metrication was completed in the 1970s.

Relay race runners typically carry a relay baton which they must transfer between teammates. Runners have a 20 m box (usually marked with blue lines) in which to transfer the baton. The first transfer is made within the staggered lane lines; for the second and third transfers, runners typically line up across the track despite the fact that runners are usually running in line on the inside of the track. This prevents confusion and collisions during transfer. Unlike the 4 × 100 m relay, runners in the 4 × 400 typically look back and grasp the baton from the incoming runner, due to the fatigue of the incoming runner, and the wider margins allowed by the longer distance of the race. Consequently, disqualification is rare.

As runners have a running start, split times cannot be compared to individual 400 m performances. Internationally, the U.S. men's team has dominated the event, but have been challenged by Jamaica in the 1950s and Britain in the 1990s.  The current men's Olympic champions are from the United States.

According to the IAAF rules, world records in relays can only be set if all team members have the same nationality.

Mixed-gendered 4 × 400 metres relays were introduced at the 2017 IAAF World Relays, with the IAAF first recognizing a world record in that event at the 2019 World Athletics Championships. In March 2022 World Athletics Council decided a set order – man, woman, man, woman – at future championships.

Records

Note: The IAAF rescinded a time of 2:54.20 set at Uniondale on 22 July 1998 by the United States (Jerome Young, Antonio Pettigrew, Tyree Washington, Michael Johnson) on 12 August 2008 after Pettigrew admitted to using human growth hormone and EPO between 1997 and 2003.

Note: The above world record was bettered by three teams at the 2018 NCAA Division I Championship on 10 March 2018 in College Station, United States:
 3:00.77 by the USC team of Zach Shinnick, Rai Benjamin, Ricky Morgan Jr., Michael Norman). This time was not record-eligible because Benjamin was a citizen of Antigua & Barbuda, and the others are United States citizens. Benjamin has since switched to represent the United States.
 3:01.39 by the Texas A&M team of Ilolo Izu, Robert Grant, Devin Dixon and Mylik Kerley. All four runners represent the United States, and World Athletics currently lists this as the NACAC area record, but it has not been ratified as the world record.
 3:01.43 by the Florida team of Kunle Fasasi, Grant Holloway, Chantz Sawyers, and Benjamin Lobo Vedel. This time was not record-eligible because Fasasi represents Nigeria, Holloway represents the United States, Sawyers represents Jamaica, and Vedel represents Denmark.

All-time top 10 by country

Men
Correct as of August 2021.

Women
Correct as of August 2022.

Mixed
Correct as of July 2022

All-time top 25

Men
Correct as of July 2022.

Note
 A USA team ran 2:54.20 in Uniondale in 1998 but the performance was annulled due to the use of performance-enhancing drugs by Antonio Pettigrew
 A USA team ran 2:56.35 in Sydney in 2000 but the performance was annulled due to the use of performance-enhancing drugs by Antonio Pettigrew
 A USA team ran 2:56.45 in Seville in 1999 but the performance was annulled due to the use of performance-enhancing drugs by Antonio Pettigrew
 A USA team ran 2:56.47 in Athens in 1997 but the performance was annulled due to the use of performance-enhancing drugs by Antonio Pettigrew
 A USA team ran 2:56.60 in Philadelphia in 2000 but the performance was annulled due to the use of performance-enhancing drugs by Antonio Pettigrew
 A USA team ran 2:57.54 in Edmonton in 2001 but the performance was annulled due to the use of performance-enhancing drugs by Antonio Pettigrew

Women
Correct as of July 2022.

Note
 A Russian team ran 3:18.82 in Beijing in 2008 but the performance was annulled due to the use of performance-enhancing drugs by Tatyana Firova

Mixed
Correct as of July 2022.

Olympic medalists

Men

Women

Mixed

World Championships medalists

Men

Women

Mixed

World Indoor Championships medalists

Men

Note* Indicates athletes who ran only in the preliminary round and also received medals.
 A USA team of Milton Campbell, Leonard Byrd, Trinity Gray and Jerome Young originally finished second in the 2001 World Indoor Championships, but was disqualified after Young was found to have used performance-enhancing drugs.
 A USA team of James Davis, Jerome Young, Milton Campbell and Tyree Washington originally won in the 2003 World Indoor Championships, but was disqualified after Young was found to have used performance-enhancing drugs.

Women

Note* Indicates athletes who ran only in the preliminary round and also received medals.
 A Russian team of Svetlana Pospelova, Natalya Nazarova, Kseniya Vdovina and Tatyana Firova originally finished second in the 2010 World Indoor Championships, but was disqualified after Firova was found to have used performance-enhancing drugs.
 A Jamaican team of Bobby-Gaye Wilkins, Clora Williams, Davita Prendergast and Novlene Williams-Mills originally finished third in the 2010 World Indoor Championships, but was disqualified after Wilkins was found to have used performance-enhancing drugs.
 A Russian team of Yuliya Gushchina, Kseniya Ustalova, Marina Karnaushchenko and Aleksandra Fedoriva originally finished third in the 2012 World Indoor Championships, but was disqualified in 2019 after Gushchina was found to have used performance-enhancing drugs.

Notable splits

Men
 Herb McKenley (Jamaica) ran a 44.6 split in the 1952 Helsinki Olympic final.
 Ron Freeman (USA) ran a 43.2 split in the 1968 Mexico Olympic final.
 Julius Sang (Kenya) ran a 43.6 split in the 1972 Munich Olympic final.
 Alberto Juantorena (Cuba) ran a 43.7 split in the 1977 IAAF World Cup event as part of the Americas team.
 Quincy Watts ran a 43.1 split and Steve Lewis (USA) ran a 43.4 split in the 1992 Barcelona Olympic final.
 Butch Reynolds ran a 43.23 split and Michael Johnson (both USA) ran a 42.91 split in the 1993 Stuttgart World Championship final; the USA team's final time of 2:54.29 is the current world record.
 Mark Richardson (GBR) ran a 43.57 split and Davian Clarke (JAM) ran a 43.51 split in the 1997 Athens World Championship final.
 Jeremy Wariner (USA) ran a 43.10 split in the 2007 Osaka World Championship final.
 Jeremy Wariner (USA) ran a 43.18 split in the 2008 Beijing Olympic final.
 Michael Norman (USA) ran a 43.06 split in the 2018 NCAA West Preliminaries final.

Women
 Jarmila Kratochvílová (CZE) ran a 47.6 split in the 1982 Athens European Championship final, a 47.75 split in the 1983 Helsinki World Championship final, and a 47.9 split in the 1983 Europa Cup in London. 
 Marita Koch (GDR) ran a 47.70 split in Erfurt 1984, a 47.9 split in the 1982 European Championship final, and a 47.9 split at the 1985 Canberra World Cup.
 Allyson Felix (USA) ran a 47.72 split in the 2015 Beijing World Championships final, a 48.01 split in the 2007 Osaka World Championships final, and a 48.20 split in the 2012 London Olympic final.
 Olga Nazarova and Olga Bryzgina (USSR) both ran a 47.80 split in the 1988 Seoul Olympic final; the Soviet team's final time of 3:15.17 is the current world record.
 Sydney McLaughlin ran a 47.91 split at the 2022 World Championships in Eugene.
 Florence Griffith-Joyner (USA) ran a 48.08 split in the 1988 Seoul Olympic final.

Notes and references

External links
IAAF list of 4x400-metres-relay records in XML

 
Track relay races
Events in track and field
Summer Olympic disciplines in athletics